Judith Josa Duckworth  , also known as Judy Duckworth, (née Verdon; 1933 – 2016) was a British government officer and philanthropist. In 1994, she became the first woman to serve as High Sheriff of Lancashire, having been appointed by Elizabeth II. In 2005, she became the first woman to serve as Vice Lord-Lieutenant of Lancashire, having been appointed by Charles Kay-Shuttleworth, 5th Baron Shuttleworth. Duckworth also served as president of the Lune Valley chapter of the Royal National Lifeboat Institution and as Chairman of the Garstang chapter of the National Society for the Prevention of Cruelty to Children.

Early life 
Duckworth was born Judith Josa Verdon in Liverpool in 1933 to Frank and Beatrice Verdon.

Public life 
In 1973, she was appointed as a magistrate at Garstang, Fleetwood, and Lancaster, serving in that capacity for thirty years.

In 1994, she was appointed by Elizabeth II, as Duke of Lancaster, to serve as High Sheriff of Lancashire. Upon her appointment, she became the first woman to serve in this office. She was appointed as a Deputy Lieutenant by Lord Lieutenant Charles Kay-Shuttleworth, 5th Baron Shuttleworth and, in 2005, was appointed as Vice-Lord Lieutenant of Lancashire, serving in this capacity for three years. In 2006, Duckworth represented Lancashire at the Queen's 80th birthday service at St Paul's Cathedral in London. She also hosted royal visits to the county by the Princess Royal, the Duke of Kent, the Duke of Gloucester, and the Earl of Wessex.

In August 2007, Duckworth attended the Pride of Lancashire Awards Evening, where she presented an award, along with Chief Constable Steve Finnegan and High Sheriff Ruth Winterbottom, to Lancashire police constables Kazim Garda and Michael Woods for rescuing Roberta Clarke from a fire.

Duckworth also served as president of the Lune Valley chapter of the Royal National Lifeboat Institution and as Chairman of the Garstang chapter of the National Society for the Prevention of Cruelty to Children.

Personal life and death

In 1959, she married Peter Duckworth, with whom she had three children. She and her husband lived in Arkholme, Bleasdale, and Sedbergh before retiring to Kirkby Lonsdale.

Duckworth died in 2016. Lord Shuttleworth, the Lord Lieutenant of Lancashire, made a statement after her death, saying, "Through all the grand events and people, Judy never forgot the human side of it all, her interest in others and the importance of her family." A Catholic funeral was held on 13 December 2016 at St Peter's Church, Stonyhurst.

References 

1933 births
2016 deaths
Deputy Lieutenants of Lancashire
English justices of the peace
English Roman Catholics
English women philanthropists
High Sheriffs of Lancashire
Politicians from Liverpool
Royal National Lifeboat Institution people
Vice-Lieutenants
Women sheriffs